Goniopora, often called flowerpot coral, is a genus of colonial stony coral found in lagoons and turbid water conditions. Goniopora have numerous daisy-like polyps that extend outward from the base, each tipped with 24 stinging tentacles which surrounds a mouth.

Distribution
Species of Goniopora can be found in the Persian Sea areas, the Indian Ocean, and various tropical and subtropical areas of the Pacific Ocean. Various species live as far north as Hong Kong (where they are the dominant colonial non-reef-building coral) and southern Japan. Goniopera were present in the Caribbean during the Miocene Epoch, although they have since gone locally extinct there.

Care
Goniopora is a sensitive coral that when probed can sensitise and contract . Goniopora are a very difficult coral to keep alive and are not recommended for a novice reef aquarium hobbyist. The short, greenish-colored species are less sturdy and durable than the pink or purple species. Many precautions must be taken to raise Goniopora. First, they require moderate to high lighting, depending on species. They must also have some water movement so their polyps can move freely. However, it should not be directed right at the polyps or the movement might be too vigorous. There must be adequate amounts of calcium and iron in the tank to help skeletal development. Placement in the tank is also crucial. They must be well positioned on a sturdy rock to avoid damaging falls. When placing Goniopora they must have enough room to grow and move their tentacles. Goniopora should be monitored for shriveling after being moved to a new tank to make sure they are getting enough sunlight.

Feeding
Goniopora are avid feeders susceptible to death from nutritional deficiencies.  There are many different ways to feed Goniopora. For example, they can be directly fed with a syringe (avoiding a hard, straight flow into the polyps or that triggers them to close up) or food can be sprinkled on the top of the tank and let to reach the Goniopora on its own. However, direct feeding seems to work best.  Alternately, plankton can be placed in the tank with all filtration systems off so the food does not get swept away. The filters should be turned back on after one to two hours to keep the tank clean and livable for all of the creatures.  Goniopora need foods high in manganese and iron.

Fragging
Goniopora grow daughter cells in a type of asexual reproduction called fragging.  The mother corals have wounds from the daughter corals that usually heal up in about two weeks. The daughter corals grow about 1 millimeter a month.  Some scientists suggest that the daughter Goniopora live inside cells of the mother coral before breaking out and growing on their own

Issues
There are many issues that go along with keeping Goniopora. The first one is that it is very hard to locate and buy, especially the red species. Goniopora may grow in murky or clear water depending on the species.  Because different species have such different requirements, it adds to the challenge of keeping them alive.

Species
This genus contains the following species:

 Goniopora albiconus Veron, 2002
 Goniopora burgosi Nemenzo, 1955
 Goniopora calicularis (Lamarck, 1816)
 Goniopora cellulosa Veron, 1990
 Goniopora ciliatus Veron, 2002
 Goniopora columna Dana, 1846
 Goniopora diminuta  (Veron, 2000)
 Goniopora djiboutiensis Vaughan, 1907
 Goniopora eclipsensis Veron & Pichon, 1982
 Goniopora fruticosa Saville-Kent, 1891
 Goniopora granulosa Pillai & Scheer, 1976
 Goniopora lobata Milne Edwards & Haime
 Goniopora norfolkensis Veron & Pichon, 1982
 Goniopora paliformis (Veron, 2000)
 Goniopora palmensis Veron & Pichon, 1982
 Goniopora pandoraensis Veron & Pichon, 1982
 Goniopora pearsoni Veron, 2002
 Goniopora pedunculata Quoy & Gaimard, 1833
 Goniopora pendulus Veron, 1985
 Goniopora petiolata Nemenzo, 1955
 Goniopora planulata (Ehrenberg)
 Goniopora polyformis Zou, 1980
 Goniopora savignyi (Dana)
 Goniopora somaliensis Vaughan, 1907
 Goniopora stokesi Milne Edwards & Haime, 1851
 Goniopora sultani Veron, DeVantier & Turak, 2002
 Goniopora tantillus (Claereboudt & Al Amri, 2004)
 Goniopora tenella (Quelch)
 Goniopora tenuidens Quelch

References

Poritidae
Cnidarian genera
Taxa named by Henri Marie Ducrotay de Blainville